Afruca tangeri is a species of fiddler crab that lives along the Atlantic coasts of western Africa and southwestern Europe.

Description
The males have one claw much larger than the other, which they use for communication. Body colouration is fairly dull for a fiddler crab, but individuals are a variety of colours from dull shades of brown, to bright orange, red or purple.

Distribution
The range of Afruca tangeri extends from southern Portugal southwards to Angola;. It is the only fiddler crab species on the Eastern Atlantic coast and the most abundant crab in The Gambia.

Taxonomy
Afruca tangeri was first described by Joseph Fortuné Théodore Eydoux in 1835 as Gelasimus tangeri, but for many years it was part of the genus Uca, which then contained all the fiddler crabs worldwide. Fiddler crabs, and all crabs in the family Ocipodidae have recently undergone a major taxonomic revision using new molecular phylogenetic evidence, which divided the fiddler crabs into 13 new genera. Therefore, the West African fiddler crab now forms the only species in the new genus, Afruca. The specific epithet  refers to the Gulf of Tangier, Morocco, the species' type locality. The common name preferred by the Food and Agriculture Organization is West African fiddler crab.

See also
Declawing of crabs

References

Ocypodoidea
Crustaceans of the Atlantic Ocean
Crustaceans described in 1835